Pınarbaşı is a village in the İdil District of Şırnak Province in Turkey. The village is populated by Kurds of the Hesinan tribe and had a population of 2,916 in 2021. It is the largest village in the district.

References 

Villages in İdil District
Kurdish settlements in Şırnak Province